Old Collegians Rugby Club, also known as Old Coll's, is a rugby union club in Adelaide, South Australia. The team was founded in 1937, and plays at Tregenza Reserve. The club's jersey is red and blue.

History 
Old Collegians first played in 1937 as Prince Alfred Old Collegians Rugby Club.

During World War II, the competition ceased from 1941 and the club was reformed on the renewal of the competition in the state in 1945. The club was then named Old Collegians Rugby Club.

OC's first home ground was in the centre of Victoria Park racecourse; the club later moved to the dairy cow-grazed pastures of the south parklands and in 1953 moved again to its current location at Tregenza Oval. 

In the early 1980s the club ran an U/18 team for three years and then formed the Junior Collegians in 1985. OC now competes in each junior age bracket.

OC is one of the two founding clubs (the other being Adelaide University) of the women's South Australian rugby competition and the only club to compete continuously from the first games in 1995 until 2018.

Many OC players have captained or represented the state at senior and junior levels over the years and have taken out SARU individual player awards. The greatest achievement so far has gone to Rod Hauser, who was selected for the Wallabies while playing for OC. In 2013 D'arcy Sadler was contracted to the Australian women's sevens squad while continuing to play for OC between tournaments.

The Club Guernsey has changed colours from the initial maroon and blue jumper with a PAC crest, to broad maroon and navy hoops in 1955, to its current light red and blue hoops in the mid 1970s.

The club's 75th year in 2012 was celebrated with a gala dinner attended by over 550 people.

Controversy

Despite a history of 24 years at the club and winning the state women's premiership in 2018, the vast majority of the women's team left the club when their complaints of bullying, mistreatment and misogyny were not responded to by the club. The women’s team raised concerns about their alleged unequal treatment at the club, which were not adequately addressed. Subsequently, approximately 20 players transferred to Adelaide University to go on and win the 2019 premiership there.

Among other concerns, the 2018 women's team had not been allowed to climb the club rafters to celebrate their win. Traditionally, victorious premiership players had climbed into the clubroom rafters on the Grand Final evening to celebrate their win. Due to safety concerns, this practice was officially banned by the committee prior to the (male) 2016 premiership teams repeating the practice without apparent recourse or penalty.

A sexual harassment complaint was also made to the club about the treatment of one female player by a male coach.

Even though the club was unable to field a women's team in 2019, they were awarded a $500,000 Federal taxpayer-funded grant the following year, for "construction of female change rooms and facilities" as part of the 2020 "sports rorts" controversy.  The club asserted it to be a proper use of funds on the basis that the club had a women’s team continuously for the 24 years prior to, and at the time of application (September 2018), and their junior membership contained a significant number of girls.  If the merit based process of application assessment conducted by Sport Australia had been followed, the cut-off score would have been 74 out of a possible 100. Old Collegians’ application had been given a score of 60.5.

Notable past players
Brock James represented Australia as an under 16, 19 and 21. He played for both the Queensland Reds and the Western Force in Super Rugby before going on to be the top points scorer in the Top 14 in France with Clermont Auvergne, appearing in numerous grand finals and the Heineken Cup.

Liam Gill (rugby) played for the Queensland Reds, RC Toulonnais, Australian National Rugby Union Team, the Australia national rugby sevens team and currently Lyon OU in the Top 14

D'arcy Sadler played for the Australia women's national rugby sevens team.

Mackenzie Sadler was in the 2014 Summer Youth Olympics playing rugby sevens for Australia. She also plays for the University of Queensland in the Aon University 7s competition and made the team of the tournament.

Notable current players
Alex Rokobaro is a former professional rugby player who played for the Fijian national rugby team, the Stade Français Paris, the Melbourne Rebels and Rugby Calvisano.

References

External links
Homepage

Rugby union teams in South Australia
Sporting clubs in Adelaide
Rugby clubs established in 1937
1937 establishments in Australia